The Vepr (Ukrainian: Вепр, wild boar) designed in 1993-1994, and was announced in 2003 as the first indigenous Ukrainian assault rifle, designed by the State Space Agency of Ukraine. It is one of several bullpup conversions of the conventional Russian  AK-family design, along with the Polish Kbk wz. 2005 Jantar, the Chinese Norinco Type 86S, the Russian OTs-14 Groza, the Finnish Valmet M82 and the South African Vektor CR-21.

History
Prior to the development of the Vepr, the personnel of the Armed Forces of Ukraine were equipped mainly with the Soviet AKM and AK-74 assault rifle designs.

In 1993, specialists of the artillery base of the Ministry of Defense in Nizhyn (Chernihiv region) on the initiative began work on the creation of a machine gun "bullpup" on the basis of the RPK with a charge of 7.62 × 39. In 1994, a machine gun was created, which was named "Vepr" (Boar) model № 1.

In 1994, samples № 2 and № 3 were also developed on the basis of RPK-74 5.45 × 39 mm and AKM 7.62 × 39 mm. Later, the SKS carbine was redesigned - № 4. The cost of processing one unit of standard weapon into a “bullpup” at that time was UAH 300.

Anatoly Anatolyev, Vladimir Sheiko, Andrey Zharkov patented their invention, but in 2001 the Nizhyn designers were summoned by management and ordered to transfer all documentation from the project to the Kyiv Radio Plant for completion.

The first Vepr rifle was shown on 28 August 2003. Only ten Veprs were made until 9 October 2004.

Ukraine's Ministry of Defense declared intentions to purchase thousands of Veprs by 2010 but by March 2014 there were no Veprs in use by the Ukrainian Army.

However, since the political tides in Ukraine are moving towards a NATO and possibly a European Union membership, and since 2009 a well-launched Ukrainian gun manufacturer (RPC Fort) is offering on the Ukrainian market firearms in "western" calibers such as the Israeli Tavor assault rifle, IMI Negev light machinegun and Galil sniper rifle, the future of this weapon in Ukrainian service may be in jeopardy.

In March 2019, it was announced that the National Police of Ukraine would replace Kalashnikov assault rifles with HK MP5 submachine guns. As of 2023, most Ukrainian personnel still use AK-74s.

The failure of the Vepr to be adopted led to the creation of the Malyuk.

Design
Although the Vepr has been proclaimed as a revolutionary upgrade to the AK-74, it is, in fact, an interesting yet fairly simple modification of the basic AK-74 system in a bullpup design, with the following modifications:
The standard gas-operated, rotating-bolt AK-74 mechanism is removed from its furniture and a new butt plate is mounted directly on the rear of the receiver.
A polymer cheek rest is fitted to the receiver cover.
The trigger and pistol grip are placed in front of the magazine.
The cocking handle is removed from the bolt carrier and a new cocking handle arrangement is placed on the left side of the forearm.

Common characteristics with the AK-74
The weapon still fires 5.45×39mm ammunition from 30-round magazines at an approximate rate of fire of 600 to 650 rounds per minute, the barrel length remains the same and the muzzle brake has been retained, which suggests that the Vepr's ballistic performance should be identical to that of the AK-74. The weapon's weight is almost the same as that of the AK-74M variant, and its length is comparable to that of a folding-stock AK with the stock folded. The main advantage of the bullpup layout thus lies in the fact that the weapon becomes much shorter and thus easier to store, to carry and to handle in confined spaces. However, the bullpup's overall superiority to conventional rifle configurations, in which the magazine and chamber are in front of the trigger and pistol grip rather than behind, has yet to be seen.

Right-handed use
The Vepr's only serious readily-visible drawback seems to be the fact that its layout, as that of the British SA80, does not favour ambidextrous operation, for three reasons:
Like the AK-74, the weapon still ejects to the right, which becomes a problem because a right-ejecting bullpup weapon, held left-handed, presents the ejection port directly against the operator's face;
Notably, the standard Kalashnikov-type combined safety lever / fire selector lever arrangement has not been revised. In the original weapon, the selector lever was noted for its relatively uncommon safe-auto-semi options sequence (rather than the typical safe-semi-auto), but the only real problems were that the lever was made infamous for its characteristic "Kalashnikov Clack" and it could not be operated without letting go of either the pistol grip or the forearm. The use of the same selector lever in a bullpup configuration adds further problems: the lack of any other form of fire selector device, which would ideally be placed as close to the trigger as possible, results in awkward handling with the weapon shouldered, especially when holding it left-handed;
The charging handle is still placed to one side, now favouring right-handed operators but making it difficult to work the cocking handle with the right hand while holding the weapon left-handed.

Accessories
The Vepr includes adjustable open sights and a conventional side mount, on the left, for day or night scopes. The front sight is strikingly similar to that of the American M16 series of rifles. A relatively large red dot sight of Ukrainian production can also be fitted as standard. The latest versions of the Vepr also include an integral 40mm underslung grenade launcher, with a dual trigger layout in which the front trigger fires the grenade launcher and the rear trigger fires the rifle.

Gallery

References

External links
 M. R. Popenker. Vepr assault rifle (Ukraine) / Modern Firearms website
 Experts with center for army, conversion and disarmament studies say Ukraine has good chances for getting established on international market of individual firearms / Ukrainian Government Portal 9 September 2003 (Archived Page)
 Vepr assault rifle featured in Point of Existence: 2

Rifles of Ukraine
5.45×39mm assault rifles
Bullpup rifles
Kalashnikov derivatives
Military equipment introduced in the 2000s